Greatest Fits is a greatest hits album by American industrial metal band Ministry, released on June 19, 2001 by Warner Bros. Records.

Background
The compilation was released to coincide with the release of the movie A.I. Artificial Intelligence, which features a scene of the band performing "What About Us?" Paul Barker had intended for "Over the Shoulder" and "Burning Inside" to appear on the compilation, but they were left off due to time limitations.

Track listing

 "What About Us?" was originally briefly featured in a scene from the film A.I. Artificial Intelligence. "So What" originally appeared on the album The Mind Is a Terrible Thing to Taste. "Reload" originally appeared on the album Filth Pig, with the 12" version from the Reload single. The cover of Black Sabbath's "Supernaut" was later featured on the album Cover Up.

Personnel
Credits adapted from the liner notes of Greatest Fits.

References

2001 greatest hits albums
Ministry (band) albums
Warner Records compilation albums